Baileys Mills is an unincorporated community in Belmont County, in the U.S. state of Ohio.

History
A post office called Baileys Mills was established in 1857, and remained in operation until 1938. The community was named after Jesse Bailey, the proprietor of a local mill.

References

Unincorporated communities in Belmont County, Ohio
1857 establishments in Ohio
Populated places established in 1857
Unincorporated communities in Ohio